Rodeo Romeo is the 15th album by country singer Moe Bandy, released in 1981 on the Columbia label. It was recorded at Sound Emprium "B", CBS recording studio "A" and mastered at the CBS Recording Studio on the CBS DisComputer System, Nashville, TN. by M. C. Rather.

Track listing
"Rodeo Romeo" (Dan Mitchell) - 2:52
"She's Playin' Hard To Forget" (Dan Mitchell) - 2:28
"You've Still Got It" (Christopher H.C. Blake, Bobby Fischer) - 2:26
"Daily Double" (Bob Morris, David W. Brewer) - 2:18
"I Wonder Where My Wanting You Will End" (Warren Robb, Shirl Milete) - 3:03
"Someday Soon" (Ian Tyson) - 3:07
"A Loser And A Fool" (Charlie Craig) - 2:13
"There's Nothing More Desperate (Than An Old Desperado)" (Dan Mitchell, Kent Blazy, Michael J. Masson) - 2:50
"The Photograph" (Jimmy Lee Anthony, Dearl F. Croft, Peggy White) - 2:40
"Recycling Memories" (Bobby Fischer, Christopher H.C. Blake) - 2:25

Musicians
David Briggs
Leo Jackson
Pete Wade
Weldon Myrick
Tommy Cogbill
Ray Edenton
Charlie McCoy
Larrie Londin
Henry Strzelecki
Jerry Carrigan
Jimmy Capps
Leon Rhodes
Jerry Kroon
Hargus "Pig" Robbins
Kenny Malone
Johnny Gimble

Backing
The Jordanaires with Laverna Moore
The Nashville Edition

References

1981 albums
Moe Bandy albums
Columbia Records albums
Albums produced by Ray Baker (music producer)